Honiton ( or ) is a market town and civil parish in East Devon, situated close to the River Otter,  north east of Exeter in the county of Devon. Honiton has a population estimated at 11,822 (based on mid-year estimates for the two Honiton Wards in 2009).

History 
The town grew along the line of the Fosse Way, the ancient Roman road linking Exeter (Isca Dumnoniorum) to Lincoln (Lindum). Contrary to 19th-century theories, it is unlikely to have been known as a stopping-point by the Romans, who built a small fort for that purpose just to the west of the present town. Honiton's location is mentioned in the Domesday Book as Honetone, meaning Huna's tun or farmstead.

Lace-making 
Honiton later grew to become an important market town, known for lace making that was introduced by Flemish immigrants in the Elizabethan era. In the 17th century thousands of people produced lace by hand in their homes, and in the 19th century Queen Victoria had her wedding dress made of Honiton lace, though the dress itself was made in the fishing village of Beer. The town also became known for its pottery.

Fires 
In 1747 and 1765 the town was badly damaged by fires. Georgian houses were then built to replace some of those that had been destroyed.

Landmarks 

The buildings of High Street are almost all Georgian, dating from after the two fires of 1747 and 1765. Of particular interest are Marwood House, 1619, and the Manor House, which was originally a coaching inn (the added porch is 19th-century). Honiton Garage dates from about 1700 and the Market Hall (which originally had arcades on the ground floor and an assembly room above) has a modest early-19th-century stone front.

Churches 

St Michael's Parish Church, which was rebuilt in 1911 after a fire, is situated on a small hill above the town. The old church was large and perfectly rectangular: it was built in the Perpendicular style, with two aisles, two transepts (which did not project), and the chancel and two chancel chapels equal to it in length. The west tower and the outer walls are all that remains of the old building. The cost of the original building was paid by Bishop Courtenay of Exeter, lord of the manor of Honiton (west part) and by John and Joan Takell (east part).

The mid-19th-century St Paul's Church was designed by Charles Fowler and is situated in the centre of the town. Its erection in 1835 required an act of Parliament and the demolition of half of the adjacent Allhallows Chapel. It was built in 1837–38 in a style incorporating elements of Romanesque architecture. There are pinnacles on the tower and the arcades inside have tall columns; above the nave is a clerestory which resembles those in early Christian basilicas.

Museum 
Allhallows Museum of Lace and Local Antiquities claims to hold one of the most comprehensive collections of Honiton lace in the world. It is located in a building, claimed to be the oldest still extant in Honiton, which formerly belonged to Allhallows School from the 16th Century until the 1930s.

Culture

Honiton Hot Pennies Ceremony 
The Hot Pennies ceremony takes place annually in the High Street of the town. It was for many years held on the first Tuesday on or after 19 July but changes to School Term dates led to it being invariably a week later and this year it is on Tuesday 27 July (2021) celebrating the 800th Anniversary of the granting of a Royal Charter in 1221 which dates back to the reign of King Stephen. It marked the beginning of Honiton Fair which was originally held on Allhallows Eve and Allhallows Day (1 November), the date was changed in 1247 to the eve and feast of St Margaret (19/20 July). The ceremony has its roots in the practice of landed gentry taking pleasure in throwing hot chestnuts from windows to local peasants and over time these gave way to hot pennies, a seemingly philanthropic gesture resulting in burns. The custom also had the purpose of encouraging people to travel to the town from the surrounding area to attend a subsequent fair without fear of arrest for their debts.

At noon, the Town Crier, accompanied by the Mayor and other local dignitaries, raises a garlanded pole with gloved hand at the top, and proclaims that "The glove is up. No man may be arrested until the glove is taken down.". Hot pennies are then thrown from a number of balconies in the High Street to crowds of local people. The pole is then kept on display for the following "fair week".

Agricultural Show 
Honiton is host to the annual Honiton Agricultural Show, an event traditionally held on the first Thursday of August in fields near the town, dating back to 1890.

Education 
Honiton has two primary schools, Honiton Primary School and Littletown Primary School, as well as a secondary school, Honiton Community College, which includes a sixth form.

Transport

Road 
Honiton is at the junction of the A35, the A30, A373 and A375 roads. The A30 now bypasses the town to the north. Until the bypass's construction in 1966, the town was blighted by traffic congestion. Though, according to many residents, it still is. The town is 10½ miles from Junction 28 of the M5. Despite Honiton's relatively small size, as a primary route destination beyond the western end of the A303, Honiton is signed from as far as Amesbury, over 60 miles away.

Rail 
Honiton railway station is on the West of England Main Line and is served by South Western Railway services to London Waterloo and Exeter St Davids.

Bus 
Stagecoach provides regular bus links to Sidmouth, Ottery St Mary and onwards to Exeter. Dartline operates the town service and limited services between Taunton & Seaton, Devon

Air 
Honiton is around 13 miles from Exeter Airport.

Twin towns 
Honiton is twinned with Mézidon-Canon in France, and Gronau (Leine) in Germany.

Notable residents 
Rose Dugdale
Samuel Graves: Admiral of the Royal Navy
 Ozias Humphry: Artist 
 Alfred Leyman: Artist
 Jo Pavey: Athlete
 Juanita Maxwell Phillips: Eleven times mayor of the town in the mid 20th century
 William Salter: Artist
 Maurice Setters: Professional footballer
 George Blagdon Westcott: Captain of the Royal Navy
 Graham Loud: professor emeritus of medieval history at the University of Leeds

References

External links 

 Honiton Town Council
 

 
Towns in Devon